Thomas Prosper Jullien (21 December 1773, Lapalud - 1798, Egypt) was a French army officer of the French Revolutionary Wars. Aide de camp to Bonaparte, he rose to the rank of captain and was brother of the famous general Louis Joseph Victor Jullien de Bidon.

Life

Early military career (1792-95)
In 1789, aged 17, he entered the National Guard of Lapalud, which had just been created. Aged 19 he became a sous lieutenant in the régiment d’Aquitaine, which later became the 35th Infantry Regiment. Six months later, in 1792, he rose to lieutenant and replaced Louis Vincent Le Blond de Saint-Hilaire

At the siege of Toulon (September - December 1793), Thomas Prosper met Bonaparte, then a lieutenant in the 34th Infantry Regiment, and took command of the chasseurs in second battalion. He then became a captain attached to the adjutant general St Hilaire (1794) and rose to captain on 3 April 1795.

Italy (1796-97)
With St Hilaire, he moved to the armée d’Italie, where he met the chief of staff in Milan. On 7 September 1796, Prosper fought in the battle at Covelo and the crossing of the Brenta gorges, where he was mentioned by Bonaparte in the same despatches as he mentioned Duroc and Augereau. On 5 October 1796, he rose to captain and Bonaparte attached him to his chief of staff, in which role the young Prosper often had the chance to meet Bonaparte at home on the  rue Chantereine. He escorted Josephine from Milan to Paris with Junot and Louis Bonaparte. He became Bonaparte's aide de camp on 9 April 1798 but the end of the Italian campaign ended before he could take up the post. In 1797, Bonaparte chose him to accompany Marmont on his embassy to Rome to meet pope Pius VI, thinking that Prosper would make a good impression on the Romans as to the manners of the French army. General Louis Desaix also described Prosper in his Journal de voyages as "a jolly boy, good manners, swarthy". René Bouscayrol wrote of him as "a handsome, swarthy infantry captain"

Egypt (1798)
On 3 May 1798 Bonaparte left Paris to embark at Toulon, accompanied by Josephine and Jullien. He became Bonaparte's aide de camp and together they set out for Egypt on 19 May that year on board the Orient. On 30 July 1798 Jullien left for Alexandria, escorted by a dozen men of 75th demi-brigade, with letters addressed to admiral François-Paul Brueys d'Aigalliers "ordering him to moor immediately in the Old Port [of Alexandria] or take refuge in Corfu" and to generals Kléber and Jacques-François Menou. He and his escort were massacred by the inhabitants of the village of Alkam (also spelled Alquam) shortly afterwards, on 2 August.

In Alexandria, Kléber wrote to Bonaparte on 22 August 1798, saying "I learned with true sorrow of the death of poor Julien [sic], your aide de camp". Bourienne wrote about the investigation into the killing, saying "No one has found any trace of this sad event besides a jacket button in the dust of a hut, situated not far from Alkam. This button bears the number of the corps which provided his escort.". On 25 August Bonaparte ordered general Lanusse to retaliate for the massacre by pillaging then destroying the village. This operation was carried out by captain Joseph-Marie Moiret  (Jullien's escort formed part of the 1st battalion of the regiment in which Moiret was serving) and it discovered the bloodied clothing of Jullien and his men in one of the houses. Moiret wrote in his memoirs:

These soldiers bodies were rediscovered - Ida de St Elme mentions:

Although bloodied weapons and uniforms were found at Alkam, it is very improbable that Jullien's corpse was rediscovered. The attack occurred on the Nile or its banks and the punitive expedition arrived twenty days after the events.

Posthumous honours
The ancient Fort Rashid, commanding the boghâz of the River Nile at the river's junction with the Mediterranean, was renamed Fort Julien (or Fort Jullien in some sources) in his honour. It was in the course of fortifications work there that the Rosetta Stone was discovered. This bust is now on show at the Trianon in the palace of Versailles. His brother, general and Comte d’Empire, commissioned five plaster copies, of which two were placed in Jullien's houses at Lapalud, two at Vannes (including one at the prefecture). O’Meara, Bonaparte's doctor on St Helena, declared in his memoirs that "the emperor loved [Jullien] greatly", whilst Bourienne's memoirs state he was a very worthy officer with great things ahead of him. All specialists on the First Empire agree that Jullien was a very talented officer who would probably have been promoted to Maréchal d’Empire by Napoleon had he not died in Egypt.

References

1773 births
1798 deaths
French military personnel of the French Revolutionary Wars
French Republican military leaders killed in the French Revolutionary Wars